Quantico may refer to:

Places in the United States

Maryland
 Quantico, Maryland, unincorporated community

Virginia
 Quantico, Virginia, a town
 Quantico Creek, a tributary of Potomac River in Virginia
 Quantico station, a train station in Quantico, Virginia
 Marine Corps Base Quantico, a US Marine Corps training base in Virginia
 Quantico National Cemetery, a cemetery adjacent to Marine Corps Base Quantico in Triangle, Virginia

Arts, entertainment, and media
 Quantico (novel), a 2005 science fiction novel by Greg Bear
 Quantico (TV series), a 2015 American thriller drama TV series

Other uses
 Quantico, a cultivar of the common fig